KWBJ-CD, virtual and UHF digital channel 22, is a low-powered, Class A YTA TV-affiliated television station licensed to Morgan City, Louisiana, United States. The station is owned by the Price Media Corporation. KWBJ-CD's studios are located on Michigan Street/Route 90/Highway 182, and its transmitter is located on Shaw Street (northeast of Jimmy Magee Park) in Morgan City.

History
KWBJ originated as a cable-only channel known as ATVC Channel 7, which launched in 1978. It was managed by Allen's TV Cable, owned by Allen Price, which has served the Morgan City area since the 1960s, and it carried local programs and special events for the Morgan City and St. Mary Parish area, before serving as a full-fledged cable channel in April 1986. Among its original programs was a newscast known as Newslook 7. On April 2, 1990, Allen's TV Cable brought the station over the air as K39BJ, broadcasting on UHF channel 39. Serving Morgan City, Houma, and the south Baton Rouge market, it originally operated as an independent station. In early 1996, K39BJ became a charter affiliate of The WB Television Network; in September of that year, the station changed its call letters to KWBJ-LP to reflect its new affiliation. The station began carrying programming from America One as a secondary affiliation in 1999.

On January 24, 2006, CBS Corporation (which split from Viacom in December 2005) and Time Warner's Warner Bros. Entertainment (the division that operated The WB) announced that they would dissolve UPN and The WB, and move some of their programming to a newly created network, The CW. One month later on February 22, 2006, News Corporation announced the launch of a competing "sixth" network called MyNetworkTV, which would be operated by Fox Television Stations and its syndication division Twentieth Television. KWBJ-LP opted against seeking an affiliation with either The CW or MyNetworkTV, instead opting to become a part-time America One affiliate while continuing to carry general entertainment programs interspersed within the network's programming. KWBJ became a YouToo America affiliate once America One folded into that network.

KWBJ's coverage via over-the-air and cable is limited to St. Mary, lower Assumption, and lower St. Martin parishes and is not available over the air or via cable/satellite in the Baton Rouge, New Orleans or Lafayette areas. Per its ownership with Allen's TV Cable, which provides cable service to said area, the station is not carried by any other providers in that area that compete with Allen's TV Cable.

Technical information

Analog-to-digital conversion
KWBJ flash-cut its digital signal into operation on UHF channel 22 in 2009. Through the use of PSIP, digital television receivers display the station's virtual channel as its UHF channel 22 instead of its former UHF analog channel 39 (most, though not all, television stations that maintain digital signals map them to their former analog channel allocations).

Programming

Syndicated programming
Syndicated programs seen on KWBJ-CD include Extra, Judge Mathis, Mike & Molly, 2 Broke Girls, Leverage, Laura McKenzie's Traveler and Pawn Stars.

Local programming
Since 2017, KWBJ has produced a local current affairs interview program, branded The Voice of the Coast; the half-hour show airs weeknights at 6:30 p.m. and is repeated at 9:00 p.m. and 8:00 a.m. the next day. The station also airs local weather updates produced by WeatherVision, during syndicated programming on its evening schedule. Prior to 2017, the station aired a 30 minute newscast. The station also produces South Louisiana Quiz Bowl, an academic competition for area high schools and junior high schools.

References

External links
 KWBJ homepage (outdated)
 KWBJ-CD on Facebook (up-to-date)
 Antenna Structure Registration 1241592

Low-power television stations in the United States
Television stations in Louisiana
Television channels and stations established in 1987
1987 establishments in Louisiana
YTA TV affiliates